Weasdale is a small hamlet in Cumbria, England,   above sea-level on the northern flanks of the Howgill Fells. Weasdale Beck rises to the south of, and passes through, the settlement  and is the major feeder to the nascent River Lune, which it meets near its crossing of the nearby A685 Kendal to Brough road. The properties there date from late 16th to mid-19th Century.

The hamlet contains a tree-and-shrub nursery.

References

Hamlets in Cumbria
Ravenstonedale